Greenland Center or Greenland Centre may refer to:

Greenland Centre, Sydney, a residential skyscraper that is currently topped out in its construction phases
Greenland Center, Xi'an, a supertall skyscraper under construction
Katuaq, Greenland's Centre for the Performing Arts
Wuhan Greenland Center, a supertall skyscraper under construction
Zifeng Tower, a skyscraper previously known as the Nanjing Greenland Financial Center